South Carolina Highway 50 (SC 50) was a state highway that existed in the central part of Orangeburg County. It connected Cordova and Orangeburg.

Route description
SC 50 began at an intersection with U.S. Route 21 (US 21) and SC 5 (now Oakland Avenue) in Rock Hill. It traveled to the east on Cedar Street, crossed over a railroad line, and traveled on Curtis Street to end at Mill Street.

History
SC 50 was established by 1943. It was decommissioned in 1947. It was downgraded to secondary roads.

Major intersections

See also

References

External links
Former SC 50 at the Virginia Highways South Carolina Annex

050 (1940s)
Transportation in York County, South Carolina
Rock Hill, South Carolina